Jamaal Jay Fudge (born May 17, 1983) is a former American football defensive back. On December 5, 2012, he signed a one-year contract for the 2013 Arena Football League season with the Jacksonville Sharks now he works as a coach for ed white high school
 He was signed by the Jacksonville Jaguars as an undrafted free agent in 2006. He played college football at Clemson.

Fudge has also played for the Atlanta Falcons.

Early years
Fudge attended Edward H. White High School in Jacksonville, Florida. He along with Dee Webb were elected to Ed White's Sports Wall of Fame in the same year.

Professional career

Jacksonville Jaguars
Fudge was signed by the Jacksonville Jaguars as an undrafted free agent in 2006. He was cut by the Jaguars in training camp 2008.

Atlanta Falcons
Fudge was signed by the Atlanta Falcons after he was cut by the Jacksonville Jaguars. He was waived on September 7, 2009, after spending the 2008 season with Atlanta. He was re-signed on October 20, when Brian Williams was placed on injured reserve.

Saskatchewan Roughriders
In October 2011, Fudge signed with the Saskatchewan Roughriders to the team's practice roster.

Jacksonville Sharks
Fudge signed with the Jacksonville Sharks for the 2013 season.

Coaching career
Fudge continues to coach in the greater Jacksonville area using the private coaching service, CoachUp.

References

External links
Clemson Tigers bio
Jacksonville Jaguars bio
Saskatchewan Roughriders bio

Living people
1983 births
Edward H. White High School alumni
Players of American football from Jacksonville, Florida
American football safeties
Clemson Tigers football players
Jacksonville Jaguars players
Atlanta Falcons players
New Orleans VooDoo players
Saskatchewan Roughriders players
Jacksonville Sharks players
American players of Canadian football